A kowari is an Australasian marsupial.

Kowari may also refer to:
 KOWARI - Residual-Stress Diffractometer, a neutron diffractometer at OPAL, Australia's research reactor
 Kowari (software), an open-source metadata database written in Java